Virginia H. Aksan (born 1946) is a Canadian historian. She is an honorary member of the Turkish Historical Society who research interest Ottoman Empire. Aksan completed her bachelor's degree at Allegheny College in the United States when she was learning Turkish language at Princeton University. 

In the following years she completed her master's and doctorate degree at the University of Toronto. Currently, she is a faculty member of history at McMaster University.

Works 
 An Ottoman Statesman in War and Peace: Ahmed Resmi Efendi, 1700–1783 (Leiden, E.J. Brill, 1995)
 Ottomans and Europeans: Contacts and Conflicts (Istanbul, Isis, 2004)
 Ottoman Wars, 1700–1870: An Empire Besieged (Hammersmith: Pearson/Longman, 2007)
 The Early Modern Ottomans: Remapping the Empire, w/ Daniel Goffman (Cambridge: Cambridge University Press, 2007)

References 

1946 births
20th-century Canadian historians
Allegheny College alumni
Princeton University alumni
Academic staff of McMaster University
Living people
21st-century Canadian historians
Scholars of Ottoman history